Shiotani (written: 塩谷 or 潮谷) is a Japanese surname. Notable people with the surname include:

, Japanese baseball player
, Japanese footballer
, Japanese photographer
, Japanese footballer
, Japanese politician

Japanese-language surnames